The Dividing Island is the second full-length album by Lansing-Dreiden. It was released in 2006.

Track listing

External links
 Review for The Dividing Island

Dividing Island, The
Lansing-Dreiden albums